Grimoaldus was Archpriest of Pontecorvo, Italy. Not much was known about his life but it is believed that he is of English descent.

Notes

Italian Roman Catholic saints
12th-century Christian saints
1137 deaths
Italian people of English descent
Year of birth unknown